Sloping Main is a rural locality in the local government area (LGA) of Tasman in the South-east LGA region of Tasmania. The 2021 census recorded a population of 47 for the state suburb of Sloping Main.

History 
Slopen Mane is a confirmed locality.

Geography
The waters of Frederick Henry Bay form the western to north-eastern boundaries.

Road infrastructure 
Route C341 (Coal Mine Road) provides access to the locality.

References

Towns in Tasmania
Localities of Tasman Council